is a former Japanese football player.

Playing career
Matsuda was born in Minokamo on September 2, 1981. After graduating from high school, he joined J2 League club Montedio Yamagata in 2000. He played several matches every season from first season. However he could not play many matches. In 2003, he moved to Regional Leagues club Shizuoka FC. In the middle of 2004, he moved to Regional Leagues club TDK and played until 2005. After 1 year blank, he moved to Regional Leagues club Okinawa Kariyushi FC and played many matches. In 2008, he moved to Japan Football League (JFL) club TDK again. He played many matches as regular player. In 2009, JFL club FC Ryukyu. He played many matches as regular player until 2010. However his opportunity to play decreased from 2011 and he could not play at all in the match in 2012. He retired end of 2012 season.

Club statistics

References

External links

1981 births
Living people
Association football people from Gifu Prefecture
Japanese footballers
J2 League players
Japan Football League players
Montedio Yamagata players
Blaublitz Akita players
FC Ryukyu players
Association football midfielders